Valacode (Village)  is a village in Kollam district in the state of Kerala, India.

References

Villages in Kollam district